Ahrori, also spelled Ahirori, is a village and corresponding community development block in Hardoi district of Uttar Pradesh, India. Located 24 km from the city of Hardoi, it hosts a regular market and hosts a Babaji festival on Asadha Sudi 15 dedicated to worship of the goddess Devi. The village has two primary schools and one clinic, as well as a public library and a sub post office. As of 2011, the population of Ahrori is 8,382, in 1,329 households.

Demographic history 
The 1961 census recorded Ahrori as comprising 6 hamlets, with a total population of 3,115 (1,763 male and 1,352 female), in 618 households and 531 physical houses. The area of the village was given as 3,062 acres. Average attendance of the Babaji fair was listed as about 500 people at the time.

The 1981 census recorded Ahrori as having a population of 4,517, in 387 households, and covering an area of 1,238.79 hectares.

Villages 
Ahrori CD block has the following 96 villages:

References 

Villages in Hardoi district